Raisa Maria Räisänen (born 10 March 1983) was a Finnish girl who disappeared, aged 16, in downtown Tampere, Finland, on 16 October 1999. Räisänen was declared dead in absentia on the fifth anniversary of her disappearance, in 2004. As of September 2022, her case remains unsolved, and it has been described as the most famous disappearance case in Finnish history.

Disappearance
On the evening of 16 October 1999, Raisa Räisänen was out celebrating with a friend. She called her boyfriend from her mobile phone at 22:18, indicating that she wanted to join him at a house party in the suburbs, if she could get a lift.

Before doing so, Räisänen and her friend visited a restaurant in the city centre; although aged only 16, they had got in using fake IDs. However, they stayed in the restaurant for only half an hour, leaving when Räisänen's friend received a phone call from her boyfriend, inviting her to a party outside Tampere. Räisänen's friend received a lift to the party from some friends, but Räisänen stayed behind as there was no room for her in the car. Räisänen's friend checked to make sure Räisänen's phone was charged, and gave her some money. The last confirmed sighting of Räisänen was from this time, at 22:50, near the Sokos department store in central Tampere.

After that, there were several unconfirmed reports of someone resembling her. The police believe that CCTV footage from the area also shows her in the city centre at around 23:50, an hour after the last confirmed sighting.

Because of the EU Summit being held in Tampere that day, security had been tightened and there was an increased police presence in the city, with additional police resources brought in from other parts of the country. However, the use of CCTV monitoring was considerably less in 1999 than it is now.

Investigation
Over time the National Bureau of Investigation investigators have checked over 3,000 clues and tips and considered numerous theories, searched extensively in the local lakes and waterways, and appealed to public in media several times.

The following three main lines of investigation are considered promising:
Older woman: two eyewitnesses saw someone matching Räisänen's description walking with an older, heavy-built woman, heading away from the city centre. After the eyewitnesses lost visual contact, they heard two loud screams. For a long time, the police were unable to identify the older woman, or to confirm whether this is connected to Räisänen's disappearance. However, in 2022 it was reported that this line of investigation remained the only one being actively pursued, and that the woman in question was thought to be a convicted murderer, Virpi Butt, who had died a year earlier.
Taxi: in 2015, a taxi driver came forward saying he had picked up a passenger matching Räisänen's description, who appeared to be cold and afraid, around midnight. He remembered the girl saying "I wonder what will happen to me?" ("Mitenköhän minulle käy?"). The police tried in vain to find a person matching the male passenger's description in the area.
Vintage car: according to some eye witnesses, someone matching Räisänen's description either entered, or was possibly bundled against her will into, a black 1950s American car, driven by a 30-something male.

The police continue to investigate the disappearance as homicide; initially as a manslaughter, but this was later changed to murder: under Finnish law, whereas manslaughter expires under statute of limitations after 20 years, murder never does.

See also
List of people who disappeared

References

External links 

1990s missing person cases
1999 in Finland
Missing person cases in Finland
Tampere